This Is Not a New Album is the 2001 re-issue of San Diegan punk band Dogwood's 1998 self-released eponymous album.  The only difference is the omission of the original track 2, "Never Die," which was re-recorded in 1999's More Than Conquerors.

Track listing
 "Firehead"
 "Belligerent Love"
 "Steinslinger"
 "Old Friends"
 "Preschool Days"
 "Suffer"
 "The Rise & Fall of Belinda & Ivan"
 "We Have No Talent"
 "What I Should Have Said"
 "Abandoned"
 "Redefine Defiance"
 "Progression"

Dogwood (band) albums
2001 albums
Reissue albums